Mogiła (Polish for "Tomb") is a Polish coat of arms. It was used by a number of szlachta (noble) families under the Polish–Lithuanian Commonwealth.

History

Blazon

Notable bearers
Notable bearers of this coat of arms have included:

External links 
  Mogila Coat of Arms and its bearers

See also
 Polish heraldry
 Heraldry
 Coat of arms

Polish coats of arms